Kristian Ranta, also known as Kride, was the guitarist of the Finnish melodic death metal band Norther, until their break up in 2012. Kristian has composed most of Norther's best known songs including Frozen Angel, and is also credited for renaming the band (originally called Requiem). Ranta has played the guitar on all the band's full-length albums, the most recent being Circle Regenerated (2011) and N (2008), and contributed clean vocals to the Solution 7 EP, Till Death Unites Us, the No Way Back EP and N. He has formed an experimental side project named Gashouse Garden with Children of Bodom drummer Jaska Raatikainen.

Kristian has also acted, along with his band mates, in a Finnish film called Vares 2. Norther and Kristian also composed a title track for this film called Frozen Angel, for which a music video, featuring images of the movie, was made. He was also interviewed in a TV documentary about Finnish heavy metal bands - Promised Land of Heavy Metal - (2009).

Kristian was a co-founder and CEO of a Finnish diabetes technology company called Mendor
until he left the company in November 2015.

Later in 2015 Kristian co-founded a company called Blooming to work on stress reduction at workplaces. Blooming was featured in TechCrunch in March 2016. Kristian was also featured in the biggest newspaper in Finland called Helsingin Sanomat in the summer of 2016 (text in Finnish).

With the lead of Kristian as its CEO, Blooming changed its name in 2016 to Meru Health and focused on building a digital treatment solution for depression and anxiety. In 2018 Meru Health got accepted to a famous startup accelerator in Silicon Valley called Y Combinator and has appeared on number of mainstream media publications such as TechCrunch, INC  and MobiHealthNews.

In 2018 Kristian started his own featured blog on Forbes magazine.

Personal information
Name: Kristian 'Kride' Ranta
Date of Birth: 13 May 1981
Place of Birth: Helsinki, Finland
Instruments Played: Guitar (since 1996) and piano (since around 1987)
Practices: at least an hour a day, sometimes more.
Idols and influences:

Guitarists: Paul Gilbert, Nuno Bettencourt, Roope Latvala, Eddie Van Halen, Michael Romeo, Zakk Wylde and Marty Friedman.

Bands: Waltari, Children of Bodom, Arch Enemy, Emperor, Sentenced, King Diamond, Stone, Eppu Normaali, Van Halen, Lost Horizon, Slayer, Pantera, Skid Row, Stratovarius, Amorphis, Opeth, In Flames.
Speaks: Finnish, English, Swedish, and German.

Equipment
 Kristian along with the rest of Norther is currently sponsored by Jackson Guitars and Guild Guitar Company.
Amfisound Custom. This guitar was created during the short time Norther was endorsed by Amfisound.
Jackson RR Custom (24 frets, skull and crossbones inlays, EMG-81 bridge and EMG-85 neck pickups) used prior to getting Amfisound custom.
Jackson KV2, Snow white with black bevels.
Guild GAD-30PCE
Black Jim Dunlop Jazz III picks
Marshall EL34 50/50 Power Amp and Digitech GSP 1101 pre-amp / multieffect
DR 11-52 set strings in D tuning
Kristian uses Steinberg Cubase for recording

Discography

Norther
Circle Regenerated (2011)
N (2008) - CD
No Way Back EP (2007) - EP
Till Death Unites Us (2006) - CD
Scream (2006) - CD Single
Solution 7 EP (2005) - EP
Spreading Death (2004) - DVD Single
Death Unlimited (2004) - CD
Spreading Death (2004) - CD Single
Mirror of Madness (2003) - CD
Unleash Hell (2003) - CD Single
Dreams of Endless War (2002) - CD
Released (2002) - CD Single
Warlord (2000) - Demo

Gashouse Garden
Untitled three-track demo

References

External links
 Kristian Ranta on MySpace—Official MySpace profile
 
 Norther—Official page
 Mendor—Official page
 

1981 births
21st-century guitarists
Finnish heavy metal guitarists
Finnish heavy metal musicians
Living people
Musicians from Helsinki
Norther members